Jules Sylvestre-Brac (born 18 August 1998) is a French professional footballer who plays as a defender for Swiss club Stade Nyonnais, on loan from Grenoble.

Club career
On 20 May 2019, Sylvestre-Brac signed with Grenoble Foot 38. He made his professional debut with Grenobole in a 0–0 Ligue 2 tie with FC Chambly on 9 August 2019.

On 31 January 2022, Sylvestre-Brac was loaned to Moulins Yzeure until the end of the season. On 1 September 2022, he moved on a new loan to Stade Nyonnais in Switzerland.

References

External links
 
 
 GF38 Profile
 

Living people
1998 births
Association football defenders
French footballers
Grenoble Foot 38 players
FC Villefranche Beaujolais players
Moulins Yzeure Foot players
FC Stade Nyonnais players
Ligue 2 players
Championnat National 2 players
Swiss Promotion League players
French expatriate footballers
Expatriate footballers in Switzerland
French expatriate sportspeople in Switzerland
Sportspeople from Annecy